From the 1960s to the 1990s, South Africa pursued research into weapons of mass destruction, including nuclear, biological, and chemical weapons under the apartheid government. Six nuclear weapons were assembled. South African strategy was, if political and military instability in Southern Africa became unmanageable, to conduct a nuclear weapon test in a location such as the Kalahari desert, where an underground testing site had been prepared, to demonstrate its capability and resolve—and thereby highlight the peril of intensified conflict in the region—and then invite a larger power such as the United States to intervene.

Before the anticipated changeover to a majority-elected African National Congress–led government in the 1990s, the South African government dismantled all of its nuclear weapons, the first state in the world which voluntarily gave up all nuclear arms it had developed itself. The country has been a signatory of the Biological Weapons Convention since 1975, the Treaty on the Non-Proliferation of Nuclear Weapons since 1991, and the Chemical Weapons Convention since 1995. In February 2019, South Africa ratified the Treaty on the Prohibition of Nuclear Weapons, becoming the first country to have had nuclear weapons, disarmed them and gone on to sign the treaty.

Nuclear weapons

The Republic of South Africa's ambitions to develop nuclear weapons began in 1948 after giving commission to South African Atomic Energy Corporation (SAAEC), the forerunner corporation to oversee the nation's uranium mining and industrial trade. In 1957, South Africa reached an understanding with the United States after signing a 50-year collaboration under the U.S.-sanctioned programme, Atoms for Peace. The treaty concluded the South African acquisition of a single nuclear research reactor and an accompanying supply of highly enriched uranium (HEU) fuel, located in Pelindaba.

In 1965, the U.S. subsidiary, the Allis-Chalmers Corporation, delivered the 20 MW research nuclear reactor, SAFARI-1, along with ~90% HEU fuel to South African nuclear authority. In 1967, South Africa decided to pursue plutonium capability and constructed its own reactor, SAFARI-2 reactor also at Pelindaba, that went critical using 606 kg of 2% enriched uranium fuel, and 5.4 tonnes of heavy water, both supplied by the United States.

The SAFARI-2 reactor was intended to be moderated by heavy water, fuelled by natural uranium while the reactor's cooling system used molten sodium. In 1969, the project was abandoned by the South African government because the reactor was draining resources from the uranium enrichment program that had begun in 1967. South Africa began to focus on the success of its uranium enrichment programme which was seen by its scientists as easier compared to plutonium.

South Africa was able to mine uranium ore domestically, and used aerodynamic nozzle enrichment techniques to produce weapons-grade material. In 1969, a pair of senior South African scientists met with Sultan Bashiruddin Mahmood, a nuclear engineer from Pakistan based at the University of Birmingham, to conduct studies, research and independent experiments on uranium enrichment. The South African and Pakistani scientists studied the use of aerodynamic-jet nozzle process to enrich the fuel at the University of Birmingham, later building their national programs in the 1970s.

South Africa gained sufficient experience with nuclear technology to capitalise on the promotion of the U.S. government's Peaceful Nuclear Explosions (PNE) program. Finally in 1971, South African minister of mines Carl de Wet gave approval of the country's own PNE programme with the publicly stated objective of using PNEs in the mining industry. The date when the South African PNE programme transformed into a weapons program is a matter of some dispute. The possibility of South Africa collaborating with France and Israel in the development of nuclear weapons was the subject of speculation during the 1970s.

South Africa developed a small finite deterrence arsenal of gun-type fission weapons in the 1980s. Six were constructed and another was under construction at the time the program ended.

South Africa only produced an operational weapon after Armscor took over production. In 1982, Armscor built the first operational weapon, code-named Hobo and later called Cabot. This device reportedly had a yield of 6 kilotons of TNT. It was eventually disassembled and the warhead reused in a production model bomb. Armscor then built a series of pre-production and production models under the code-name Hamerkop (a bird). While Hobo/Cabot were not functional, the Hamerkop series were smart television-guided glide bombs.

Testing the first device
The South African Atomic Energy Board (AEB) selected a test site in the Kalahari Desert at the Vastrap weapons range north of Upington. Two test shafts were completed in 1976 and 1977. One shaft was 385 metres deep, the other, 216 metres. In 1977, the AEB established its own high-security weapons research and development facilities at Pelindaba, and during that year the program was transferred from Somchem to Pelindaba. In mid-1977, the AEB produced a gun-type device—without a highly enriched uranium (HEU) core. Although the Y-Plant was operating, it had not yet produced enough weapons-grade uranium for a device. As has happened in programmes in other nations, the development of the devices had outpaced the production of the fissile material.

Atomic Energy Commission officials say that a "cold test" (a test without uranium-235) was planned for August 1977. An Armscor official who was not involved at the time said that the test would have been a fully instrumented underground test, with a dummy core. Its major purpose was to test the logistical plans for an actual detonation.

How that test was cancelled has been well publicised. Soviet intelligence detected test preparations and in early August alerted the United States; US intelligence confirmed the existence of the test site with an overflight of a Lockheed SR-71 spy plane. On 28 August, The Washington Post quoted a US official: "I'd say we were 99 percent certain that the construction was preparation for an atomic test."

The Soviet and Western governments were convinced that South Africa was preparing for a full-scale nuclear test. During the next two weeks in August, the Western nations pressed South Africa not to test. The French foreign minister warned on 22 August of "grave consequences" for French-South African relations. Although he did not elaborate, his statement implied that France was willing to cancel its contract to provide South Africa with the Koeberg nuclear power reactors.

In 1993, Wynand de Villiers said that when the test site was exposed, he ordered its immediate shutdown. The site was abandoned and the holes sealed. One of the shafts was temporarily reopened in 1988 in preparation for another test, which did not take place; the move was intended to strengthen South Africa's bargaining position during negotiations to end the war with Angola and Cuba.

Viable delivery

The warheads were originally configured to be delivered from one of several aircraft types then in service with the South African Air Force (SAAF), including the Canberra B12 and the Hawker Siddeley Buccaneer. Concerns about the vulnerability of the ageing aircraft to the Cuban anti-aircraft defence network in Angola subsequently led the SADF to investigate missile-based delivery systems.

The missiles were to be based on the RSA-3 and RSA-4 launchers that had already been built and tested for the South African space programme. According to Al J Venter, author of How South Africa built six atom bombs, these missiles were incompatible with the available large South African nuclear warheads. Venter claims that the RSA series, being designed for a 340 kg payload, would suggest a warhead of some 200 kg, "well beyond SA's best efforts of the late 1980s." Venter's analysis is that the RSA series was intended to display a credible delivery system combined with a separate nuclear test in a final diplomatic appeal to the world powers in an emergency even though they were never intended to be used in a weaponized system together.

Three rockets had already been launched into suborbital trajectories in the late 1980s in support of development of the RSA-3 launched Greensat Orbital Management System (for commercial satellite applications of vehicle tracking and regional planning). Following the decision in 1989 to cancel the nuclear weapons program, the missile programs were allowed to continue until 1992, when military funding ended, and all ballistic missile work was stopped by mid-1993. In order to join the Missile Technology Control Regime, the government had to allow American supervision of the destruction of key facilities applicable to both the long-range missile and the space launch programmes.

Collaboration with Israel

David Albright and Chris McGreal reported that South African projects to develop nuclear weapons during the 1970s and 1980s were undertaken with long-term cooperation from Israel. The United Nations Security Council Resolution 418 of 4 November 1977 introduced a mandatory arms embargo against South Africa, also requiring all states to refrain from "any co-operation with South Africa in the manufacture and development of nuclear weapons".

According to the Nuclear Threat Initiative, in 1977 Israel traded 30 grams of tritium for 50 tonnes of South African uranium, and in the mid-1980s assisted with the development of the RSA-3 and RSA-4 ballistic missiles, which are similar to the Israeli Shavit and Jericho missiles. Also in 1977, according to foreign press reports, it was suspected that South Africa signed a pact with Israel that included the transfer of military technology and the manufacture of at least six nuclear bombs.

In September 1979, a US Vela satellite detected a double flash over the Indian Ocean that was suspected, but never confirmed, to be a nuclear test, despite extensive air sampling by WC-135 aircraft of the United States Air Force. If the Vela incident was a nuclear test, South Africa is virtually the only possible country, potentially in collaboration with Israel, which could have carried it out. No official confirmation of its being a nuclear test has been made by South Africa. In 1997, South African Deputy Foreign Minister Aziz Pahad stated that South Africa had conducted a test, but later retracted his statement as being a report of rumours.

In February 1994, Commodore Dieter Gerhardt, former commander of South Africa's Simon's Town naval base who was later convicted of spying for the USSR, was reported to have said:Although I was not directly involved in planning or carrying out the operation, I learned unofficially that the flash was produced by an Israeli-South African test code-named Operation Phoenix. The explosion was clean and was not supposed to be detected. But they were not as smart as they thought, and the weather changedso the Americans were able to pick it up.Proliferation: A flash from the past David Albright, The Bulletin of the Atomic Scientists  Nov 1997, pp. 15In 2000, Gerhardt said that Israel agreed in 1974 to arm eight Jericho II missiles with "special warheads" for South Africa.

In 2010, The Guardian released South African government documents that confirmed the existence of Israel's nuclear arsenal. According to The Guardian, the documents were associated with an Israeli offer to sell South Africa nuclear weapons in 1975. Israel categorically denied these allegations and claimed the documents do not indicate any offer for a sale of nuclear weapons. Israeli President Shimon Peres claimed that The Guardian article was based on "selective interpretation... and not on concrete facts." Avner Cohen, author of Israel and the Bomb and The Worst-Kept Secret: Israel's Bargain with the Bomb, said "Nothing in the documents suggests there was an actual offer by Israel to sell nuclear weapons to the regime in Pretoria."

Collaboration with Taiwan
According to David Albright and Andrea Strickner, South Africa also engaged in close, long-term cooperation with Taiwan, which at the time was controlled by the autocratic KMT regime, sometimes along with the Israelis. Taiwan bought 100 tons of uranium metal from South Africa which was delivered between 1973 and 1974. In 1980 the Taiwanese contracted for 4,000 tons of uranium metal although it is not known how much of this order was ever delivered. In 1983 Taiwan and South Africa agreed to cooperate on laser enrichment, chemical enrichment, and building a small reactor. The South African reactor program was slowed down in 1985 due to budget cuts and was cancelled completely half a decade later. The enrichment programs also likely ended around this time.

Dismantling
South African forces feared the threat of a "domino effect" in favour of communism, represented in southern Africa by Cuban forces in Angola, aiding Angolan Marxist-Leninist revolutionary groups against rivals supported by South African forces, and threatening Namibia. In 1988, South Africa signed the Tripartite Accord with Cuba and Angola, which led to the withdrawal of South African and Cuban troops from Angola and independence for Namibia. The pre-emptive elimination of nuclear weapons was expected to make a significant contribution toward regional stability and peace, and also to help restore South Africa's credibility in regional and international politics. F.W. de Klerk saw the presence of nuclear weapons in South Africa as a problem. F. W. de Klerk disclosed the information about his weapons to the United States in an effort to get the weapons removed.

South Africa ended its nuclear weapons programme in 1989. All the bombs (six constructed and one under construction) were dismantled and South Africa acceded to the Treaty on the Non-Proliferation of Nuclear Weapons when South African Ambassador to the United States Harry Schwarz acceded to the treaty in 1991. On 19 August 1994, after completing its inspection, the International Atomic Energy Agency (IAEA) confirmed that one partially completed and six fully completed nuclear weapons had been dismantled. As a result, the IAEA was satisfied that South Africa's nuclear programme had been converted to peaceful applications. Following this, South Africa joined the Nuclear Suppliers Group (NSG) as a full member on 5 April 1995. South Africa played a leading role in the establishment of the African Nuclear-Weapon-Free Zone Treaty (also referred to as the Treaty of Pelindaba) in 1996, becoming one of the first members in 1997. South Africa also signed the Comprehensive Nuclear-Test-Ban Treaty in 1996 and ratified it in 1999.

In 1993, Bill Keller of The New York Times reported that popular suspicion in Southern African nations held that the timing of disarmament indicated a desire to prevent a nuclear arsenal from falling into the hands of a native African and Coloured government with the collapse of the Apartheid system controlled by European settlers. De Klerk denied such a motivation when asked about this in a 2017 interview. The African National Congress political party, which took power in South Africa after Apartheid, approved of nuclear disarmament.

The Treaty of Pelindaba came into effect on 15 July 2009 once it had been ratified by 28 countries. This treaty requires that parties will not engage in the research, development, manufacture, stockpiling acquisition, testing, possession, control or stationing of nuclear explosive devices in the territory of parties to the treaty and the dumping of radioactive wastes in the African zone by treaty parties. The African Commission on Nuclear Energy, in order to verify compliance with the treaty, has been established and will be headquartered in South Africa.

South Africa signed the Treaty on the Prohibition of Nuclear Weapons on 20 September 2017, and ratified it on 25 February 2019.

Weapons grade uranium stores
As of 2015, South Africa still possessed most of the weapons grade uranium extracted from its nuclear weapons, and had used some of it to produce medical isotopes. There had been three security breaches at Pelindaba since the end of Apartheid, with a 2007 breach described by a former US official as being "horrifying", although the South African government dismissed the 2007 breach as a "routine burglary".

Biological and chemical weapons

In October 1998, the report of the South African Truth and Reconciliation Commission publicly revealed Project Coast, a clandestine government chemical and biological warfare program conducted during the 1980s and 1990s. Project Coast was initiated in 1981 and initially, defensive aspects were the prime objective but as time progressed, offensive programmes became more pervasive and more important. It became the sole programme for the creation of a range of chemical and biological agents for offensive and defensive use within South Africa as well as neighbouring territories.
Two categories of offensive products were developed: 
 weapons for mass destruction; here the research focused mostly on biological development processes, especially for run-of-the-mill bacteria including anthrax, tetanus, cholera and especially food poisoning agents such as salmonella bacteria.
 secondly, researching and developing weapons in the “dirty tricks" program, where products could be supplied for individual assassinations. These consisted of toxins in chemical, plant and in biological nature.
On the defensive side, Project Coast oversaw research into the development of agents to protect troops in battle and VIPs against chemical or biological attack. The project was also tasked with developing CS and CR gas agents for crowd control, developing defensive training programs for troops and developing protective clothing.

The program reported to the South African Defence Force Surgeon General (Maj. Gen. N. J. Nieuwoudt (1980-1988) and Maj. Gen. D.P. Knobel (1988–1998)). Nieuwoudt recruited South African cardiologist and army officer Brig. Wouter Basson (1981–1992) as Project Officer and ultimately Nieuwoudt and Basson recruited a large contingent of medical professionals, scientists and weapons specialists to research and develop these weapons and associated antidotes. Basson was replaced by Col. Ben Steyn in 1992 (1992–1995). Several front companies were created, including Delta G Scientific Company, Protechnik and Roodeplaat Research Laboratories to facilitate the research and development of chemical and biological weapons.

After Basson's arrest in 1997, documents found in his possession revealed that the "dirty-tricks" products included anthrax-laced cigarettes, household items contaminated with organophosphates and paraoxon-laced gin and whisky. Other unverified claims include that a so-called infertility toxin was introduced into black townships, and that cholera was deliberately introduced into the water sources of some South African villages. It was also claimed that South Africa supplied anthrax and cholera to government troops in Rhodesia (now Zimbabwe), which it is alleged were used against guerrillas there. In January of 1992, the government of Mozambique alleged that either South Africa, or South African backed Renamo forces deployed an artillery-delivered airburst chemical weapon during a battle at a rebel base in Tete province. Five soldiers were said to have died, and many more were injured. South African military and civilian doctors collected samples from the Mozambican government, and denied any involvement in the matter. The programme operated until 1993.

See also
History of biological warfare
Helikon vortex separation process
Military history of South Africa
Nuclear weapons and Israel
Denel Overberg Test Range
Cold War

Notes

References

Joseph Cirincione, Jon B. Wolfsthal, Miriam Rajkumar. Deadly Arsenals: Nuclear, Biological, and Chemical Threats. Washington D.C.: Carnegie Endowment For International Peace, 2005.

Further reading

 Burgess, Stephen F. and Helen E. Purkitt. The Rollback of South Africa's Chemical and Biological Warfare Program, USAF Counterproliferation Center. April 2001. Online. 
 Cross, Glenn. Dirty War: Rhodesia and Chemical Biological Warfare, 1975–1980, Helion & Company, 2017.
 Polakow-Suransky, Sasha. The Unspoken Alliance: Israel's Secret Relationship With Apartheid South Africa, Pantheon, 2010.

External links

Birth and Death of the South African Nuclear Weapons Programme, Waldo Stumpf, Atomic Energy Corporation of South Africa, October 1995
South Africa and the nuclear option, Marcus Duvenhage, 1998
Out of South Africa: Pretoria’s Nuclear Weapons Experience (in pdf), Lt. Col. Roy E. Horton, ACDIS Occasional Paper, Program in Arms Control, Disarmament, and International Security, University of Illinois, August 2000
Out of (South) Africa: Pretoria’s Nuclear Weapons Experience, Roy E. Horton, USAF Institute for National Security Studies, August 1999
Nuclear Files.org guide to proliferation – South Africa
The Nuclear Weapon Archive account of South Africa
Israel conducted nuclear experiment in 1979
South Africa's Nuclear Autopsy: The Risk Report, Wisconsin Project on Nuclear Arms Control, 1996
Nuclear verification in South Africa , Adolf von Baeckmann, Gary Dillon and Demetrius Perricos, IAEA Bulletin Volume 37 Number 1
Annotated bibliography for the South African Nuclear Program from the Alsos Digital Library for Nuclear Issues 
South Africa's Nuclear Weapons Storage Vault
Israel and the South African Bomb
The Woodrow Wilson Center's Nuclear Proliferation International History Project The Wilson Center's Nuclear Proliferation International History Project contains primary source material on South Africa's nuclear weapons program.

 
Weapons of mass destruction by country
Military of South Africa
Nuclear weapons programs
Foreign relations of South Africa
Nuclear weapons of South Africa
Israel–South Africa relations
Abandoned military projects of South Africa